Hinunangan, officially the Municipality of Hinunangan (Kabalian: Lungsod san Hinunangan;), is a 3rd class municipality in the province of Southern Leyte, Philippines. According to the 2020 census, it has a population of 29,149 people.

Hinunangan is known as the "Rice Granary of the Province" for its vast plain land that is entirely planted with rice. Hinunangan has great potential for tourism because of its beautiful sandy beaches and islands. The town is also a producer of rattan and wood-based furniture, abaca handicraft items, pineapple, vegetables, other forest products, and bamboo furniture. It has a potential for mineral water and root crop processing and copper mining.

Hinunangan is also known as a major gateway in Leyte because of its near proximity to Tacloban City. The opening of Abuyog–Silago Road cuts travel time from Tacloban by half from the previous 6 hours to less than 3 hours. It is also the place in Southern Leyte with the most immigrants from Europe and North America.

It has a lot of tourist places, such as Tahusan, Talisay, or the twin islands (known as Cabugan Grande and Cabugan Chico as Pigafetta stated in his account during their travel with Magellan).. There are also hotels, inns, a public market, and beach resorts.

History 
In 1521, Magellan recorded the sighting Hunonganan (Hinunangan) during the voyage in Leyte Gulf. As far back as 1750, Hinunangan was a mid-way station of Boholanos trading in Eastern Leyte. They rested overnight at the mouth of Das-ay River where they moored their boats. A shelter was built for the crews and tenders known as "hononganan" or stopover. Hence the name. In 1822, a certain Boholano named Palonoy founded Hinunangan. At this time, Silago to the north and Hinundayan and Anahawan to the south were part of Hinunangan.

In 1944, in the greatest naval battle in history the blocking warship of the Liberation waylaid the Japanese Fleet near Hinunangan. Thus, the area in Southern Leyte is the natural frontier of historically significant events in Philippine history.

2007 earthquake 
On July 19, 2007, a strong earthquake hit the town with a magnitude 6 on the Richter scale and damaged some properties.   The partial assessment report of Hinunangan dated July 20, a copy of which was obtained by PIA through Gov. Mercado, placed the estimated cost of damage to properties at P1,650,000.00 broken down as P790,000 for government infrastructure and P860,000 from private infrastructure.

Among the public properties destroyed were the water system - P 500,000; Das-ay Bridge railguard - P100,000; East Central School Concrete Fence - P80,000; Otama Elementary School - P50,000; Patong Elementary School - P40,000; and Tahusan Elementary School—P20,000.

The private infrastructure damaged included the Roman Catholic Bell tower - P100,000; Water tank of the Catholic convent - P40,000; Manalog barangay Chapel - P20,000; Santo Nino barangay Chapel - P10,000; a number of houses - P400,000, and various appliances, P290,000.

Geography

Barangays 
Hinunangan is politically subdivided into 40 barangays, two of which are island barangays located at the east of the town. The twin islands are accessible by motorized boats through Barangay Canipa-an.

Climate

Demographics

Economy

Banking and Finance
Philippine National Bank
 Saints Peter & Paul Multi-Purpose Cooperative
 Leyte South Multi-Purpose Cooperative

Education

Primary schools
 Hinunangan East Central School
 Hinunangan West Central School
 Catublian Elementary School
 Nava Elementary School
 Canipaan Elementary School
 Ambacon Elementary School
 Calag-itan Elementary School
 Pondol Elementary School
 Manalog Elementary School
 Patong Elementary School
 Otama Elementary School
 Ingan Elementary School

Secondary schools
 Holy Rosary Academy - a Private Roman Catholic school
 Hinunangan National High School - formerly Hinunangan Agricultural and Vocational School
 Canipaan National High School
 Nava National High School

Tertiary Schools
 Southern Leyte State University - Hinunangan Campus (formerly Southern Leyte Institute of Agriculture and Technology)

Others
 Hinunangan Skills and Technological Center  - TESDA accredited vocational school.

Healthcare
Zenon T. Lagumbay Memorial Hospital
Hinunangan Community Hospital
Santo Domingo Family Clinic

Media
Hinunangnon - crowdsourcing social news network in Hinunangan, founded in 2016 that brings digital news and top stories locally from Hinunangan and its Province or around the world.
92.1 MHz FM - Spin FM Hinunangan (Defunct)
90.8 MHz FM - Mix FM Hinunangan
105.0 MHz FM -  Best FM Hinunangan

Communication 
Mobile:
 Smart Communications (Since 2002)
 Globe Telecom (Since 2004)
 Sun Cellular (Since 2012)

Cable television:
 Fiesta Cable TV
 Direct-To-Home (DTH) satellite TV Service providers

Internet:
 SMART 4G Network
 Globe 4G Network

Gallery

References

External links 

 Hinunangan Profile at PhilAtlas.com
 [ Philippine Standard Geographic Code]
Philippine Census Information
Local Governance Performance Management System
Travels through Hinunangan

Municipalities of Southern Leyte